Wellpark is a suburb of Galway city, Ireland. The area is bordered by the N6 Dublin Road to the south, the Tuam Road to the West and the suburb of Mervue on the east.

Amenities 
(Irish: Garrain Phairc An Uarain, meaning "the home of the well")[2][3]  Wellpark is a Gaeltacht[2] suburb of Galway city, Ireland. The area is bordered by the N6 Dublin Road to the south, the Tuam Road to the West and the suburb of Mervue on the east. It is 3 km (2 mi) east of Galway city, on the R336. Wellpark is on the eastern side of the county's Gaeltacht (Irish-speaking district) and of the city region. It is a tourist centre with a scenic beach, harbour, and shore fishing.

The area is home to the Wellpark Retail Centre which is a shopping area which boasts outlets such as Peter Pan, Reid Furniture, Maplin, Sony Centre, Toy City, Atlantic Homecare,  PC World, Eddie Rocket's, Carpet Right and the Eye Cinema. It also has underground car-parking, and is based behind the plush "g" Hotel. The broadcasting headquarters of i102-104FM radio are also based here.

The area is also home to numerous housing developments, and various employers in the Mervue Business Park and the Thermo King plant.

Demographics 
Wellpark is home to 1,509 people  based on the 2006 Census. It is a relatively small area sized 0.816 km².

See also
 List of towns and villages in Ireland

References 

Geography of County Galway